Francisco Cabrera Hernandez (born October 10, 1966) is a former Major League Baseball catcher/first baseman who played five seasons with the Toronto Blue Jays and the Atlanta Braves, from  to .

Cabrera started his career with the Toronto Blue Jays, playing three games with them before being traded to the Braves for Jim Acker in the middle of the 1989 season.

Career highlights

August 21, 1991
Cabrera is credited with hitting the home run that marked the turning point in the history of the Atlanta Braves. On Wednesday, August 21, 1991, the Braves played the Reds and entered the ninth inning trailing, 9–6. Reds ace reliever Rob Dibble was on the mound with two outs. Cabrera had started the game to give Braves starter Greg Olson a much-needed rest. With two outs, David Justice doubled, and Brian Hunter walked to bring Cabrera to the plate with the tying run. He responded with a three-run homer off Dibble to tie the game, which the Braves eventually won in 13 innings. The game kept them 2.5 games behind the Dodgers in a race they eventually won by one game. The Braves went 29–12 after Cabrera's home run and eventually reached the World Series before losing to the Twins in seven games.

1992 National League Championship Series

Cabrera is best known for his two out game-winning pinch hit off Stan Belinda in the 9th inning of the 7th and deciding game of the 1992 National League Championship Series that put the Braves into the World Series. Cabrera hit a line drive over shortstop Jay Bell on a 2–1 pitch to left field that scored David Justice and a slow footed Sid Bream, who barely beat a left-field throw from Barry Bonds to win the pennant for the Braves. Amazingly, before this pinch hit, Cabrera had batted only ten times during the 1992 season. This marked the end of the three-year divisional championship run of the Pittsburgh Pirates, who after the 1992 season lost Bonds, Doug Drabek, and other key players from those championship teams. The Pirates did not have another winning season until 2013.

External links

1966 births
Living people
Albany-Colonie Diamond Dogs players
Atlanta Braves players
Dominican Republic expatriate baseball players in Canada
Dominican Republic expatriate baseball players in Japan
Dominican Republic expatriate baseball players in the United States

London Monarchs baseball players
Major League Baseball catchers
Major League Baseball first basemen
Major League Baseball players from the Dominican Republic
Orix BlueWave players
Richmond Braves players
Thunder Bay Whiskey Jacks players
Toronto Blue Jays players
Acereros de Monclova players
China Times Eagles players
Dominican Republic expatriate baseball players in Mexico
Dominican Republic expatriate baseball players in Taiwan
Dunedin Blue Jays players
Knoxville Blue Jays players
Myrtle Beach Blue Jays players
Olmecas de Tabasco players
St. Catharines Blue Jays players
Syracuse Chiefs players
Ventura County Gulls players